Le Vingtième Siècle (The Twentieth Century) was a Belgian newspaper that was published from 1895 to 1940. Its supplement Le Petit Vingtième ("The Little Twentieth) is known as the first publication to feature The Adventures of Tintin.

The conservative Catholic newspaper was founded by Georges Helleputte, Joseph d'Ursel, and Athanase de Broqueville (brother of Belgian Prime Minister Charles de Broqueville). Its first issue was published on 6 June 1895. It sold poorly and was kept alive by Charles de Broqueville and other Belgian aristocrats.

In 1914, Fernand Neuray took over as editor-in-chief. He distanced the newspaper from the Catholic alignment and tried to position it as a national newspaper.

Notes and references 

 Pierre Assouline, Hergé, Plon, 1996.

1895 establishments in Belgium
1940 disestablishments in Belgium
Defunct newspapers published in Belgium
Bandes dessinées
French-language newspapers published in Belgium
Publications established in 1895
Publications disestablished in 1940
Catholic newspapers
Tintin